The 1958 World Chess Championship was played between Mikhail Botvinnik and Vasily Smyslov in Moscow from March 4 to May 9, 1958. Botvinnik won.  Smyslov had unseated Botvinnik in the 1957 match, so he was entitled to this rematch a year later.

Results

The match was played as best of 24 games. If it ended 12-12, Smyslov, the holder, would retain the Championship.

Botvinnik regained his title.

External links
1958 World Chess Championship at the Internet Archive record of Graeme Cree's Chess Pages

1958
1958 in chess
Chess in the Soviet Union
1958 in Russia
1958 in Soviet sport
1958 in Moscow